Lanzhou Metro or Lanzhou Rail Transit is a rapid transit system in Lanzhou, Gansu, China.

There will be  lines in operation at the end of 2022, including Line 1 (in operation) and Line 2 (open in 2022). The first two lines will cost about 23 billion yuan ($3.6 billion).

Lines in operation

Line 1

Line 1 started construction on July 9, 2012, the first phase measures  with 20 stations. The line is completely underground. Line 1 opened on 23 June 2019.

Lines under construction

Line 2

Line 2 was planned to start construction at the end of 2015. It will run from Yanbei Road to Dongfanghong Square, all within Chengguan District. The line have 2 transfer stations to Line 1, at Wulipu station and Dongfanghong Square station. In December 2017, tunnel boring for the second line commenced. The line will open in 2022.

Under planning

In long-term planning, there will be 5 lines totaling . Due to the urban geography of Lanzhou following a river valley, most of the lines will run east-west parallel to the Yellow River. There will be lines connecting the main urban center with Lanzhou Zhongchuan Airport, Yuzhong county and Gaolan county.

Line 2 (Phase 2)
Stations
 Nanguanshizi
 Shuangchengmen
 Sunjiatai
 Shangxiyuan
 Lanzhou University of Technology
 Wuwei Road
 West Railway Station, transfer to line 1, high speed and heavy rail
 Huoxing Road
 Yellow River Market
 Shilidian
 Baile Square
 Shuiguazhuang
 Lanzhou Jiaotong University
 Feijiaying
 Cuijiazhuang
 Majiazhuang
 Huangjiatan
 Xiahewan

Line 3
Line 3 is entirely in the planning phase. Unlike the first two lines, it will have above-ground sections. A road-rail bridge is planned to carry Line 3 over the Yellow River, continuing its route above ground.
Stations
 Railway station, transfer to Lanzhou Railway Station
 Hezheng Road
 Five springs square
 Zhengning Road
 Xiguan, transfer to line 1
 Miaotanzi
 Caochang Street
 Yanchangbao
 Xingangcheng
 Yanxi Road
 Yanbei Road, transfer to line 2
 Arts college
 Baidaoping
 Doudaogou

Line 4
Line 4 is entirely in the planning phase.
Stations
 Yantan Road
 Yantanshizi
 Yanyuan Road, transfer to line 2
 Yanxing Road
 Yandong Street
 Fanjiawan
 Donggang, transfer to line 1
 Heping
 Weiliu Road
 Dingyuan
 New Technology City

Line 5
Line 5 is entirely in the planning phase and is planned to be from Chengguan District to Lanzhou Zhongchuan Airport via Zhonghe town in Gaolan County.

Technology

Rolling stock
Line 1 is served by a fleet of 26 Type A rolling stock trainsets of 6 cars each, with a capacity of 2460 passengers per trainset. The rolling stock is manufactured in Changchun by China's CRRC. The train sets are developed to be able to withstand sand storms, and feature aluminium bodywork with sand resistant paint, sand resistant glass, and the ventilation system is designed to handle large amounts of dust in the air.

Production of the first trains started in March 2016. In October 2016, the first two metro trains were delivered.

A few of the trainsets in service on Line 1 carry the colour scheme of Line 2 which is still under construction.

Payment system
All stations have ticket barriers which can be entered using China T-union cards, either personally bound, or bought for single journeys from ticketing machines.

Since December 2019, passengers can also pay using the Tencent Ride app (:zh:騰訊乘車碼).

Network Map

External links

References

 
Rapid transit in China
Transport in Lanzhou
Railway lines opened in 2019
2019 establishments in China